Gosure (고수레) is a form of ritual action from Korean folk religion, in which food is thrown into the air after shouting "Gosure" (pronounced "go-su-REH"). This ritual stems from the belief that people will get ill if the ritual is not performed.

Folktale 
The folk tale associated to this ritual comes from various regions in Korea. There is a story about a poor woman with the family name of "Go", and she survived with the help from the people from the village. After she died, people threw food in the air after shouting her name "Go See ne!", which means "to misses Go" in Korean language.

References

Religion in Korea
Muism